Lodhoma is a village and gram panchayat in the Darjeeling Pulbazar CD block in the Darjeeling Sadar subdivision of the Darjeeling district in the state of West Bengal, India.

Geography

Location  

Singalila National Park on the Singalila Ridge is located nearby.

Area overview
The map alongside shows the northern portion of the Darjeeling Himalayan hill region. In Darjeeling Sadar subdivision 61% of the total population lives in the rural areas and 39% of the population lives in the urban areas. There are 78 tea gardens/ estates (the figure varies slightly according to different sources), producing and largely exporting Darjeeling tea in the district. It engages a large proportion of the population directly/ indirectly. Some tea gardens were identified in the 2011 census as census towns or villages. Such places are marked in the map as CT (census town) or R (rural/ urban centre). Specific tea estate pages are marked TE.

Note: The map alongside presents some of the notable locations in the subdivision. All places marked in the map are linked in the larger full screen map.

Demographics
According to the 2011 Census of India, Lodhoma had a total population of 703 of which 348 (50%) were males and 355 (50%) were females. There were 40 persons in the age range of 0 to 6 years. The total number of literate people in Lodhoma was 578 (82.22% of the population over 6 years).

Civic Administration

Police station
Lodhoma police station has jurisdiction over the Darjeeling Pulbazar CD block.

Economy
Rammam Hydroelectric Power Plant, commissioned in 1995–96, is located 3 km upstream of Lodhama.

Healthcare
There is a primary health centre, with 10 beds, at Lodhoma.

References

Villages in Darjeeling district